Carl Blasco (born 11 September 1971) is an athlete from France.  He is a triathlete.

Blasco competed at the first Olympic triathlon at the 2000 Summer Olympics.  He took nineteenth place with a total time of 1:50:18.02.

Four years later, at the 2004 Summer Olympics, Blasco again competed.  This time, he placed twelfth with a time of 1:53:20.16.

References

1971 births
Living people
French male triathletes
Triathletes at the 2000 Summer Olympics
Triathletes at the 2004 Summer Olympics
French LGBT sportspeople
Gay sportsmen
Olympic triathletes of France
LGBT triathletes
20th-century French LGBT people
21st-century French LGBT people